Mary Agnes Reardon (1912-2002) was a Catholic liturgical artist; she was a painter, muralist, designer and illustrator of children's books.

Reardon attended Radcliffe College and the Yale School of Fine Arts; she also studied in Mexico with artist David Alfaro Siquieros.

Reardon painted murals for many religious institutions. Major works include the Guadalupe chapel and two transept ceilings at the National Shrine of the Immaculate Conception in Washington, D.C., a triptych at the Cathedral of Mary our Queen in Baltimore, Maryland, an early mural at Cabot Hall at Radcliffe College, two half domes, soffits and historical walls at the St. Louis Cathedral.

Reardon also illustrated seven children's books.  The best known of these is Snow Treasure, with text written by Marie McSwigan.  In 2015, this book is in the collection of more than 1400 libraries.

Book illustrations
Snow Treasure
Pope Pius XII, Rock of peace

References

External links
 Mary A. Reardon Papers at the Massachusetts Historical Society 
 Mary Reardon papers at the Smithsonian Archives of American Art

1912 births
2002 deaths
American muralists
20th-century American painters
Radcliffe College alumni
Yale School of Art alumni